{{DISPLAYTITLE:C20H24N2O2}}
The molecular formula C20H24N2O2 (molar mass: 324.42 g/mol, exact mass: 324.1838 u) may refer to:

 Affinine
 Quinidine
 Quinine

Molecular formulas